Marouane, Merouane or variations thereof may refer to:

Given name

Marouane
 Marouane Ben Amor (born 1989), Tunisian footballer
 Marouane Braiek (born 1985), Tunisian retired football goalkeeper
 Marouane Chamakh (born 1984), Moroccan-French footballer
 Marouane Fakhr (born 1989), Moroccan football goalkeeper
 Marouane Fehri (born 1979), Tunisian former volleyball player
 Marouane Fellaini (born 1987), Belgian footballer
 Marouane M'rabet (born 1985), Tunisian volleyball player
 Marouane Sahraoui (born 1996), French-born Tunisian footballer
 Marouane Soussi (born 1988), Tunisian handball player
 Marouane Troudi (born 1990), Tunisian retired footballer

Merouane
 Merouane Abdouni (born 1981), Algerian retired football goalkeeper
 Merouane Anane (born 1990), Algerian footballer
 Merouane Dahar (born 1992), Algerian footballer
 Merouane Guerouabi (born 1989), Algerian actor and comedian
 Merouane Kial (born 1972), Algerian footballer
 Merouane Zemmama (born 1983), Moroccan football manager and former player
 Merouane Zerrouki (born 2001), Algerian footballer

Other
 Marouan Chouiref (born 1990), Tunisian handball player
 Marouen Maggaiz (born 1983), Tunisian handball goalkeeper

Other uses
 Fatima Marouan (born 1952), also spelled Fatema Marouane, Moroccan physician, business executive and politician
 Leïla Marouane, pseudonym of Tunisian-born French Algerian journalist and creative writer Leyla Zineb Mechentel (born in 1960)

See also
 Marwan

Masculine given names